Francis Romero (Caracas) is a Venezuelan actress of theatre, film, radio, and television.

Early life 
Francis Romero was born in Caracas. She grew up in the Chacao development with her mother and two brothers, Alessandro and Christian.

Whilst in her fifth year of high school, she enrolled in The National Theater School, now closed. Finishing high school, she began relentlessly looking for training as an actor: she trained in the "Actors Studio" of Enrique Porte, then in 1998 graduated from the University Institute of Theatre (IUDET), now the National Experimental University of the Arts (UNEARTE), with a cum laude degree in Theater Management and Production.

Career 
Her beginnings in television were at Radio Caracas Televisión (RCTV), where she played extra roles like "elevator rider 3" and "secretary 4". Little by little she got better roles until winning a lead in the telenovela La dama de rosa, by José Ignacio Cabrujas. However, her first contract was later, for Caribbean, when an actress in the cast got pregnant and Romero was called as an emergency replacement. She worked at RCTV for thirteen years.

Francis then moved to the channel Venevision to join the cast of Aunque mal paguen, by Alberto Barrera Tyzka, where she played "Sagrario".

Similarly, she has starred in several films, including two short films ("La Transfusión", by Hugo Gerdel, and "Onda Corta", by Carolina Vila) and feature films including Operación Billete, by Olegario Barrera; Luna Llena, by Ana Cristina Henríquez; Disparen a Matar, by Carlos Azpúrua; and Móvil Pasional by Mauricio Walerstein.

She is also a certified speaker from the School of Social Communication of the Central University of Venezuela. Her voice and image has appeared in several advertising messages and radio soap operas.

She joined the cast of Gaz, a version of Euripides' The Trojan Women that was shown in the theater La Mama Experimental Theatre Club (La MaMa ETC) in New York City, directed by Elia Schneider.

Romero won the Municipal Theater Award in 2007 for the best supporting actress for her role as Mercedes in the play "La Quinta Dayana", written by Elio Palencia and directed by Gerardo Blanco López  

In the 2009 edition, she won again as best supporting actress for her role as Aunt Anyula in the play La Nona, written by Roberto Cossa and directed by Consuelo Trum.

Filmography

Film

Television

Theatre

Radio 
As speaker and producer:
 2011: "Aquí entre nos con Francis Romero y José Vieira" Clásicos 94.9 FM. Caracas - Venezuela.
 2010: "SOS con Crisol Carabal y Francis Romero" Familia 94.9 FM. (133 Emisiones diarias) Caracas - Venezuela. 
 2009: "SOS con Crisol Carabal y Francis Romero" Tierra Nueva 94.9 FM. (133 Emisiones diarias) Caracas - Venezuela.
As radionovela actress:
 2006: "Días de baile" . Radio Gladys Palmera 96.6 FM. Barcelona - España.
 1999: "Spectrum contra Spectrum y la Máscara Escarlata". Radio Rumbos 670 AM. Caracas - Venezuela.
 1999: "La Princesa Rebelde". Radio Rumbos 670 AM. Caracas - Venezuela.
 1999: "Enséñame a Quererte". Radio Rumbos 670 AM. Caracas - Venezuela.	 
 1999: "Únicamente Tú". Radio Rumbos 670 AM. Caracas - Venezuela.		
 1999: "La Crónica del Misterio". Radio Rumbos 670 AM. Caracas - Venezuela.

Awards and recognitions 
 2009: Best Actress. Premio Municipal de Teatro. Caracas - Venezuela.
 2007: Best Actress. Premio Municipal de Teatro. Caracas - Venezuela.

References

External links 

 Biography at Francis Romero.
 Las Primeras Actrices de Venezuela 20/07/2013
 Las actrices más bellas y famosas toman el teatro Aquilino José Mata, 02/09/2010, Informe21
 Las lecciones del Festival Internacional de Teatro Ángel Ricardo Gómez, 2 April 2013, El Universal

Year of birth missing (living people)
Living people
Venezuelan film actresses
Venezuelan television actresses
Venezuelan stage actresses
People from Caracas
20th-century Venezuelan actresses
21st-century Venezuelan actresses